WMKG-CD, virtual and UHF digital channel 31, is a low-powered television station licensed to Muskegon, Michigan, United States. Its studios are located on Airline Road in Norton Shores, Michigan near the junction of I-96 and US 31. The station is owned by WMKG-TV, LLC.

History

WMKG-CD was founded by Bud Kelley and his family in 1989 as W40AK. It first went on the air on April 1, 1990, originally broadcasting on channel 40. The call letters were changed to WMKG-LP in 1995. It moved to channel 38 in 2004. In September 2006, Comcast cable dropped the station from its analog channel lineup to allocate more bandwidth for video on demand services.  Currently, the station is available on digital cable and broadcasting on 49, but displayed channel 38 through PSIP until that system malfunctioned; it currently uses channel 49 for display of its channels.

The station held the LP calls until October 2009, when it acquired Class A television service status to become WMKG-CA. Despite the station's low-power status, its location near Lake Michigan assures amplification of their signal across the lake into the Milwaukee market within the Port Washington and Sheboygan areas (Milwaukee itself is served by low-power station WTSJ-LD on Channel 38). The station was issued its license for digital operation on October 10, 2014, at which point it changed its call sign to WMKG-CD.

The station has had several minor network affiliations throughout its history, and currently affiliates with The Family Channel; this is a duplicative affiliation within the Grand Rapids market, as WLLA (channel 64) also carries that network over their main subchannel.

According to an MLive.com article dated December 25, 2016, "Channel 49.1 -- channel 397 on cable -- broadcasts family-oriented shows and Muskegon programs including churches and square dancing. Channel 49.2 broadcasts religious music. Channel 49.3 shows movies. Channel 49.4 has a western theme."

Original programming
The station has produced original programming from the start. Programs include "Dial A Bargain", a show where a viewer calls in for gift certificates, and "Muskegon Today", a local program dealing with issues involving the city. Other programs include "Table Talk", "The Doorstop Nation", and "TV BINGO"

For most of its history, the station also had a local newscast airing at 5:30 PM. However, it is no longer on the air.

Station sale after a decade
In October 2007, Kelley Enterprises put the station up for sale, including the license and equipment, citing that the owner is retiring and has plans to move south. As of 2008, the station's license is still in Kelley's name, per FCC records. Late 2009 the station was sold to BAG LLC of New York and the sale was approved by the FCC., but BAG LCC of New York failed to show up to the closing. In 2009 the station was placed back on the market. In December 2016, the station was for sale on Craigslist; the owner was quoted by MLive.com as saying "It's past my retirement time."

Kelley was finally successful in selling the station in June 2017, when he sold it to Steve Kanzer, the principal of VRVC, LLC, a virtual venture capital fund and a western Michigan native residing in Florida with a summer lakeside home in Norton Shores. Kanzer plans to update the station's operations to digital standards, along with using its post-spectrum move to channel 31 to its advantage, rebranding it in connection with U.S. Highway 31, which runs up the Lake Michigan shoreline, including an older style "31" highway shield as its new logo.

Digital channels
The station's digital signal is multiplexed:

References

External links
Official website
Official website

MKG-CD
Muskegon County, Michigan
Television channels and stations established in 1990
Low-power television stations in the United States
1990 establishments in Michigan